The 2003 Soul Train Music Awards were held on March 1, 2003, at the Pasadena Civic Auditorium in Pasadena, California. The show was co-hosted by Queen Latifah and Arsenio Hall.

Special awards

Quincy Jones Award for Outstanding Career Achievements – Male
 LL Cool J

Quincy Jones Award for Outstanding Career Achievements – Female
 Mariah Carey

Sammy Davis, Jr. Award for "Entertainer of the Year"
 Nelly

Winners and nominees
Winners are in bold text.

R&B/Soul or Rap Album of the Year
 Nelly – Nellyville
 Ashanti – Ashanti
 LL Cool J – 10
 Nas – Stillmatic

Best R&B/Soul Album – Male
 Musiq Soulchild – Juslisen
 Gerald Levert – The G Spot
 Jaheim – Still Ghetto
 Justin Timberlake – Justified

Best R&B/Soul Album – Female
 Ashanti – Ashanti
 Amerie – All I Have
 Mary J. Blige – No More Drama
 Angie Stone – Mahogany Soul

Best R&B/Soul Album – Group, Band or Duo
 B2K – B2K
 Boyz II Men – Full Circle
 Floetry – Floetic
 R. Kelly and Jay Z – Best of Both Worlds

Best R&B/Soul Single – Male
 Musiq Soulchild – "Dontchange"
 Maxwell – "This Woman's Work"
 Justin Timberlake – "Like I Love You"
 Usher – "U Don't Have to Call"

Best R&B/Soul Single – Female
 Ashanti – "Foolish"
 Amerie – "Why Don't We Fall in Love"
 Erykah Badu  – "Love of My Life (An Ode to Hip Hop)"
 India.Arie – "Little Things"

Best R&B/Soul Single – Group, Band or Duo
 B2K  – "Bump, Bump, Bump"
 Dru Hill – "I Should Be..."
 Floetry – "Floetic"
 TLC – "Girl Talk"

The Michel Jackson Award for Best R&B/Soul or Rap Music Video
 Missy Elliott – "Work It"
 50 Cent – "Wanksta"
 Nelly  – "Dilemma"
 Busta Rhymes  – "Pass the Courvoisier, Part II"

Best R&B/Soul or Rap New Artist
 Amerie
 Heather Headley
 Nappy Roots
 Tweet

Best Gospel Album
 Kirk Franklin – The Rebirth of Kirk Franklin
 The Canton Spirituals – Walking By Faith
 Donald Lawrence and The Tri City Singers – Go Get Your Life Back
 Hezekiah Walker and the Love Fellowship Crusade Choir – Family Affair II: Live at Radio City Music Hall

Performers
 Mariah Carey
 LL Cool J
 Amerie
 Nelly, The St. Lunatics and Kelly Rowland
 Musiq
 Dru Hill
 India.Arie
 Justin Timberlake
 Gerald Levert
 Lil' Kim

References

Soul Train Music Awards, 2003
Soul Train Music Awards
Soul
Soul
Soul